The 2008 Copa América de Futsal was the 9th edition under FIFA rules, 20th edition of the main international futsal tournament of the South America region. It took place in Montevideo, Uruguay from 23 June to 28 June 2008.

The tournament acted as a qualifying tournament for the 2008 FIFA Futsal World Cup in Brazil.

Championship
The ten participating teams are divided into three groups of three in the first two groups and four teams in the last group, which will play each in a single round-robin format. The top team of each group advances to the semi-finals with the second placed team from Group C. The top three teams for the tournament will earn participation at the 2008 Futsal World Cup, if Brazil is one of the top 3, the third ticket to the World Cup will go to the fourth placed team in the championship.

Group A

Group B

Group C

Knockout stage

9th place

7th place

5th place

Semi-finals

3rd Place

Final

Final classification

References
CONMEBOL Futsal Championship 2008 @ Goalzz

Copa América de Futsal
International association football competitions hosted by Uruguay
Copa América de Futsal, 2008
2007–08 in Uruguayan football
Futsal in Uruguay